WVCY-FM (107.7 FM) is a radio station located in Milwaukee, Wisconsin. Owned by VCY America, WVCY-FM is the flagship affiliate of their Milwaukee-based Christian radio network. The station also has multiple translators within the state of Wisconsin and several other Midwest states.

VCY America was founded by Vic Eliason.

Programming

WVCY's programming includes Christian Talk and Teaching programming including; Crosstalk, Worldview Weekend with Brannon Howse, Grace to You with John MacArthur, In Touch with Dr. Charles Stanley, Love Worth Finding with Adrian Rogers, Revive Our Hearts with Nancy DeMoss Wolgemuth, The Alternative with Tony Evans, Liberty Counsel's Faith and Freedom Report, Thru the Bible with J. Vernon McGee, Joni and Friends, Unshackled!, and Moody Radio's Stories of Great Christians.

WVCY also airs a variety of vocal and instrumental traditional Christian Music (and completely disallows Christian Contemporary Music in any form, to the point outside programming is dropped if it plays it), as well as children's programming such as Ranger Bill. The station also carries political debates from the state's public television networks, along with major speeches such as the State of the Union Address.

History
The station was first licensed February 26, 1964, and held the call sign WBON. The station aired religious and classical music. On June 11, 1973, the station's call sign was changed to WVCY.

Translators
WVCY-FM has one direct translator located in Sheboygan, which transmits from a county-owned tower located within Taylor Park.

See also
 VCY America
 Vic Eliason
 List of VCY America Radio Stations

References

External links
VCY America official website 

VCY-FM
VCY-FM
Radio stations established in 1964
1964 establishments in Wisconsin
VCY America stations